is a Japanese football player for FC Ryukyu.

His older brother, Hiroshi, is also a football player.

Club statistics
Updated to end of 2018 season.

References

External links
Profile at JEF United Chiba

Profile at Roasso Kumamoto

1991 births
Living people
Fukuoka University alumni
Association football people from Ōita Prefecture
Japanese footballers
J1 League players
J2 League players
Sagan Tosu players
Roasso Kumamoto players
JEF United Chiba players
Tokushima Vortis players
FC Ryukyu players
Association football midfielders